"It's Love" is a song by progressive metal band King's X, appearing on their album Faith Hope Love. It was released in 1990 on Megaforce Records. It is the band's highest charting single, peaking at #6 on Mainstream Rock Tracks in 1990. The song is much noted for its Beatles-like sound.
The picture seen on the front can also be found on the back of the booklet of the album Faith Hope Love.

Track listing
 "It's Love"
 "We Were Born to Be Loved"
 "Six Broken Soldiers (Extended Version)"

Charts

References

External links 
 

1990 singles
1990 songs
King's X songs
Megaforce Records singles
Songs written by Doug Pinnick
Songs written by Jerry Gaskill
Songs written by Ty Tabor